Nightbird is the debut solo studio album by the English singer-songwriter Paul Carrack.  It came out in 1980, shortly after Carrack's tenure with Roxy Music, and featured musical contributions from several Roxy session musicians, as well as backing vocals (and a songwriting contribution) from Carrack's former Ace bandmate Alan "Bam" King.  Nightbird was originally released on Vertigo Records in the UK and Europe, and was reissued in 2004 on PolyGram.

The album's pre-release single was "Beauty's Only Skin Deep".  On that single, it was indicated the album was to be called Showing Off.

Shortly after this album was issued, Carrack joined the band Squeeze.  He stayed a member of Squeeze for most of 1981 before resuming his solo career.

Track listing

Personnel 
Credits are adapted from the album's liner notes.
 Paul Carrack – lead and backing vocals, keyboards, guitars
 Winston Delandro – guitars 
 Neil Hubbard – guitars
 Tim Renwick – guitars
 Alan Spenner – bass 
 Kuma Harada – bass
 Richard Bailey – drums
 Andy Newmark – drums 
 Jeff Seopardie – drums
 Neville Murray – percussion
 Mel Collins – saxophones 
 Malcolm Griffiths – trombone 
 Guy Barker – trumpet 
 Martin Drover – trumpet 
 Dyan Birch – backing vocals 
 Alan "Bam" King – backing vocals 
 Noel McCalla – backing vocals

Production 
 Producers – Paul Carrack and Phill Brown (all tracks); Alan Callan (tracks 1, 6 & 7).
 Engineer – Phill Brown
 Assistant Engineer – Barry Sage
 Recorded at RG Jones Studios (London, UK).
 Mixed at Basing Street Studios (London, UK).
 Front Cover Photos – Iain McKell (black and white) and Brendan Walsh (color).
 Back Cover Portrait – Mike Prior

References

External links

1980 debut albums
Vertigo Records albums
Paul Carrack albums